North Main Avenue Historic District is a national historic district located at Newton, Catawba County, North Carolina. The district encompasses 86 contributing buildings in a primarily residential neighborhood of Newton. Most of the buildings date from the late-19th an early-20th century and includes notable examples of Colonial Revival and Bungalow / American Craftsman style architecture. Notable buildings include the Junius R. Gaither House (c. 1936), First Presbyterian Church (1878), Eli M. Deal House (1904), Wade C. Raymer House (1923), William W. Trott House (c. 1897), Dr. Glenn Long House (c. 1910, 1935), Hewitt-McCorkle House (1920), Andrew J. Seagle House (c. 1861), Walter C. Feimster House (1908), Robert B. Knox House (1912), (Former) Newton High School (1905, 1935), Henkel-Williams-White House (c. 1883), Loomis F. Klutz House (c. 1927), (former) Newton Elementary School (1923, 1930), and Beth Eden Lutheran Church (1929).

It was added to the National Register of Historic Places in 1986.

References

Historic districts on the National Register of Historic Places in North Carolina
Colonial Revival architecture in North Carolina
Buildings and structures in Catawba County, North Carolina
National Register of Historic Places in Catawba County, North Carolina